This article is a list of notable individuals who were born in and/or have lived in Junction City, Kansas.

Arts and entertainment

Film, television, and theatre
 Iva Kitchell (1908–1983), comedian, dancer
 Rockne Tarkington (1931–2015), actor
 Kevin Willmott (1959– ), film director, screenwriter
John Cameron Mitchell (1963– ), actor, playwright, screenwriter, director

Journalism
 Peggy Hull (1889–1967), journalist

Literature
 Velina Hasu Houston (1957– ), playwright, poet, essayist

Music
 Marvin Ash (1914–1974), jazz pianist

Other visual arts
 Marion Manley (1893–1984), architect
 Fred Otnes (1925–2015), illustrator, painter
 Mary Rockwell Hook (1877–1978), architect
 Renee Stout (1958– ), assemblage artist

Business
 Marillyn Hewson (1953– ), aerospace and defense executive
 Amanda Jones (1835–1914), entrepreneur, inventor

Crime

Law enforcement
 Thomas A. Cullinan (1838–1904), city marshal, lawman

Military

 John Byers Anderson (1817–1897), U.S. Army Colonel, Military Superintendent of Railroads
 Michael P. C. Carns (1937– ), U.S. Air Force General
 Adna R. Chaffee, Jr. (1884–1941), U.S. Army Major General
 Walter D. Ehlers (1921–2014), U.S. Army 2nd Lieutenant, Medal of Honor recipient
 John C. H. Lee (1887–1958), U.S. Army Lieutenant General
 John A. Seitz (1908–1987), U.S. Army Brigadier General
 Richard J. Seitz (1918–2013), U.S. Army Lieutenant General

Politics

National
 John Alexander Anderson (1834–1892), U.S. Representative from Kansas
 John Davis (1826–1901), U.S. Representative from Kansas
 Dwight D. Eisenhower (1890–1969), 34th President of the United States, General of the Army

State
 Leslie A. Miller (1886–1970), 17th Governor of Wyoming

Sports

American football
 Mark Dennis (1965– ), offensive tackle
 Ron Prince (1969– ), coach

Baseball
 Joey Devine (1983– ), relief pitcher
 George Giles (1909–1992), first baseman
 Bob Horner (1957– ), first and third baseman
 John Wells (1922–1993), pitcher

Other
 Steve Henson (1968– ), basketball point guard, coach
 Bobby Lashley (1976– ), mixed martial artist, pro wrestler
 James C. Wofford (1944– ), equestrian
 Isiah Young (1990– ), U.S. Olympic track and field sprinter

See also
 Lists of people from Kansas

References

Junction City, Kansas
Junction City